Agnes Dumisani Mizere is a Malawian TV personality, journalist, and blogger. she has been a journalist in Malawi for over twenty years. She was one of the pioneers of TV Malawi when it first launched in 1999 where she worked as journalist. She is best known for covering issues about Malawian traditional culture, sexual minorities, and human interest stories.  She currently works as a talk show host on Zambezi Magic’s “Grapevine” talk show  where she continues to cover topical issues in Malawi such as gender, sex, HIV/AIDS. She also continues to do freelance work and mentor journalists i Malawi.

Early life
Mizere was born in Malawi but also lived in the USA and South Africa. She attended Slippery Rock University in Pennsylvania and Catholic University in Washington D.C., and eventually received her Diploma in Journalism from Birnam Business College in South Africa with Honors at a time when Malawi had no journalism schools.

Awards
Media Institute of Southern Africa Malawi’s Annual Media Awards, “Best blogger" 2015

References

Malawian journalists
Malawian columnists
Women columnists
Living people
Year of birth missing (living people)
Malawian women journalists